Wood End is a hamlet in the civil parish of Soberton in the City of Winchester district of Hampshire, England.

Villages in Hampshire